The Ambassador of Saudi Arabia to the United States is the official representative of the Kingdom of Saudi Arabia to the President and Government of the United States of America. The ambassador and the embassy staff work at the Saudi Embassy in Northwest, Washington, D.C. The formal title of the role is Ambassador of the Custodian of the Two Holy Mosques to the United States of America with the rank of Minister.

List of ambassadors

See also
 Saudi Arabia–United States relations
 Embassy of Saudi Arabia, Washington, D.C.
 Ambassadors of the United States to Saudi Arabia

References

Saudi Arabia
United States